Marcus Warren Hobbs (born 1970), known by his stage name Marcus Satellite is an American composer, electronic musician, microtonal music, and computer graphics professional noted for creating microtonal electronic music and animated films using advanced computer software.

Early life 
Hobbs was born in Fontana, California to Vicki Jo Adams and Evan Kenneth Hobbs.  He has three brothers: Sean, Daemon, and Alan, and a sister, Erin.  His mother was a singer, pianist, and church organist.  His father was a painter and guitarist.  His parents exposed Marcus to art and music, especially rock music and classical music and informally taught him guitar and piano.  In 1982 they bought a VIC-20 on which Marcus learned to program by creating video games.

Marcus graduated from the University of California, Riverside in 1991 with a Bachelor's Degree in Computational mathematics.

Film credits 
In 1992 Hobbs began working at Walt Disney Animation Studios.  His first film credits were Aladdin, The Lion King, and Trail Mix-Up.  He learned how to apply his programming skills to the synthesis of 3-dimensional computer imagery and in 1995 was promoted to Technical Director on Pocahontas and Hercules.  He became a Supervisor for Atlantis: The Lost Empire, Mickey's PhilharMagic, Mickey's Twice Upon A Christmas, and Meet The Robinsons.

Music 
In 1995 Hobbs began integrating his software expertise with music composition, purchasing numerous electronic instruments including a Devilfish (a modified Roland TB-303) and a Kyma (sound design language) from Symbolic Sound Corporation.  He was introduced to microtonalist and music theorist Erv Wilson by Carla Scaletti and Kurt J. Hebel.  He created many software instruments which implemented several of Wilson's tuning theories such as Moments Of Symmetry, Combination Product Sets.

In 1998 he released his first album From On High under the name Marcus Satellite.  Each track features software instruments tuned to a different tuning of Wilson's and lyrics and vocals by American singer and songwriter K Blu.  The project was sequenced using Steinberg Cubase.

In 2002 he completed his second album Way Beyond, Way Above, a collaboration with Russian singer and songwriter Masha d'Elephenden.  The project featured Kyma software instruments, a Roland MC-505, a Roland MC-303, sequenced on an Apple Power Mac G4 using Steinberg Cubase.  The album was released 2007.

In 2004 he completed his third album My Silent Wings, a collaboration with English singer and songwriter Rocket Excelsior.  This was Hobbs' first album to use only software instruments, rendered on an Apple Macintosh G4.  Hobbs also switched sequencers to Ableton Live.  The computation necessary to render the many layers of software instruments required many passes and motivated Hobbs to search for more efficient synthesis methods.  The album has yet to be released.

In 2006 he released 9 microtonal singles A Boy Named Peace, A Girl Named Love, The Exquisite Corpses Play Darwin, Full Moon Fire, I Love, I, Marcus, Scaling Lambdoma 6, Stormy Eyes, To The Moon, and Trading Tykes The Magick Words.  Hobbs invested nearly 6 months programming software instruments in Native Instruments's Reaktor and purchased a Power Mac G5 to achieve real-time rendering of each of these works.

In 2007 he released The Marcus Satellite Tribute To U2, consisting of 13 electronica cover songs of popular U2 songs.  The work is faithful to the form of the original songs, and features dozens of layers of software synthesizers rendered in real-time.

Hobbs has also scored the forthcoming independent film, Desert Vows.

Personal life 
Hobbs and his wife Heather have two children, Lucas and Madeline.

External links 
Marcus Satellite

University of California, Riverside alumni
Living people
1970 births